Saint Epimachus was a Roman martyr, and is commemorated on 10 May.

After his martyrdom his body was laid in a crypt on the Via Latina and later the body of Saint Gordianus who was martyred during the time of Julian the Apostate was laid beside Epimachus.  The two saints gave their name to the cemetery, and are jointly venerated by the Catholic Church. 

Many writers have denied the existence of an Epimachus martyred at Rome, and account for the relics honoured there by asserting that the body of a Saint Epimachus from Alexandria who was transported to Rome shortly before the martyrdom of St. Gordianus.  The Bollandist Remi de Buck maintained that the evidence for the Roman Epimachus is too strong to be doubted, and denied that any relics of Epimachus of Alexandria came to Rome. the body of the Alexandrian Epimachus was translated to Constantinople.

Other Saint Epimachuses
There are also several martyrs named Epimachus, and, owing to the meagreness of the information possessed concerning them some writers have confounded them greatly while hagiologists are unable to agree as to their number or identity.  The Bollandists mention others of this name:

 A martyr commemorated by the Orthodox on 6 July, (Acta SS., XXIX, 280)
 Epimachus and Azirianus, martyrs venerated by the Copts and Ethiopians on 31 October (Acta SS., LXI, 684)
 Epimachus of Pelusium in Egypt, martyred at Alexandria in the persecution of Decius, venerated by the Eastern Orthodox on 31 October and by the Copts on 14 Pashons and commemorated in the Latin Church on 12 Dec.
 Epimachus and Alexander, martyred at Alexandria in the persecution of Decius, commemorated in the Latin Church on 12 Dec.

References

3rd-century Christian saints

sv:Gordianus och Epimachus